All the King's Men is a 2002 album by The Legendary Pink Dots.

Track listing 
 Cross Of Fire
 The Warden
 Touched By The Midnight Sun
 Rash
 The Day Before It Happened
 Brighter Now
 Marz Attacks
 Sabres At Dawn
 All The King's Men
 The Brightest Star

Credits
Edward Ka-Spel - voice, keyboards
The Silverman (Phil Knight) - keyboards, electronics
Martijn de Kleer - guitars, violin
Niels van Hoorn - horns
Raymond Steeg - sound wizardry

References

2002 albums
The Legendary Pink Dots albums
ROIR albums